Daniella Zeva Rabbani (born September 6, 1984) is an American actress, singer and voiceover artist. She has appeared in a number of films and television shows, including Ocean's 8, God Friended Me, The Americans, Appropriate Behavior, Floating Sunflowers, Bridge and Tunnel  and Laughs.

In addition, Rabbani has worked extensively with the National Yiddish Theater Folksbiene, starring in the Theater's 2008 production of Gimpel Tam, 2010 production of Hershele Ostropolyer and 2012 production of The Golden Land (a 2013 Drama Desk Award nominee).  She has also performed with the Vermont Shakespeare Company and at the Edinburgh Festival Fringe. Her voiceovers have been featured at New York's Ellis Island, Paris' Grand Palais and national commercial campaigns.  Daniella attended the Tisch School of the Arts at New York University.

References

External links
https://m.imdb.com/name/nm4313350

1984 births
Living people
American people of Israeli descent
Tisch School of the Arts alumni
Place of birth missing (living people)